The 1981 Oklahoma Sooners football team represented the University of Oklahoma during the 1981 NCAA Division I-A football season. They played their home games at Oklahoma Memorial Stadium and competed as members of the Big Eight Conference. They were coached by head coach Barry Switzer. The Sooners defeated the  Houston Cougars 40–14 to win the 1981 Sun Bowl in El Paso, Texas.

Schedule

Roster

Game summaries

Oklahoma State

 
Fred Sims scored three short-yardage touchdowns to lead Oklahoma to a 27–3 win over their instate rivals in a steady drizzle. Sims, who carried 23 times for 66 yards, scored on runs of two and five yards in the second quarter and a one-yard run in the third.

Rankings

Postseason

NFL draft
The following players were drafted into the National Football League following the season.

References

Oklahoma
Oklahoma Sooners football seasons
Sun Bowl champion seasons
Oklahoma Sooners football